Andrew J. Toth is a retired United States Air Force major general who last served as the commander of the Air Force Personnel Center. Previously, he was the Director of Operations of the Air Combat Command.

References

External links

Year of birth missing (living people)
Living people
Place of birth missing (living people)
United States Air Force generals